Eupithecia thomasi is a moth in the family Geometridae. It is found in India (Darjeeling, Sikkim) and Nepal.

References

Moths described in 2008
thomasi
Moths of Asia